Maximilian Le Cain (born 1978) is an Irish filmmaker, cinephile and film critic living in Cork City, Ireland. His always-personal, formally experimental work has included narrative, documentary, and video art installation, although it mostly wanders restlessly somewhere between those categories. Le Cain has made more than sixty short and medium-length films and videos over the past decade. He has written for many magazines such as Senses of Cinema, Film Ireland and Rouge and in several books, including The Cinema of Roman Polanski: Dark Spaces of the World (Wallflower Press, 2006). He is also the editor of the online magazine devoted to experimental cinema called Experimental Conversations.

(An)Other Irish Cinema

(An)Other Irish Cinema is the work of three resolutely independent filmmakers based in Ireland who have built up prolific filmographies over the past decade in complete creative freedom, taking full advantage of the liberty for experimentation that low-and-no budget production offers. Although the visions audiences discover in the films of Dónal Foreman, Rouzbeh Rashidi and Maximilian Le Cain are very different, they are linked by the use of exploratory, non-script-based approaches to filmmaking and by a keen awareness of the cinema histories that have explored the medium's possibilities far beyond the accepted rules of the multiplex.

Foreman, Rashidi and Le Cain formed '(An)Other Irish Cinema' as a platform for joint screenings, to showcase their work and, in so doing, to propose the possibility of an/other filmmaking culture in Ireland.

Operation Rewrite

Operation Rewrite is an ongoing multidisciplinary art project by Esperanza Collado and Maximilian Le Cain initiated in January 2011. Its original form consisted of an online experimental video project to which both artists contributed with extremely short pieces following specific formal and conceptual criteria. The duration of each piece was 45 seconds, consisting of approximately 30 seconds of images and 15 seconds of black screen. 45,33 is a collage created from the 33 pieces of video made so far, some of which incorporate Super8 and 16mm film, and structured according to a numerical system. The project has broadened to include performances, installations, films, video, and an artist's book that explore the workings of the cut and interruption as fundamental associative principles of cinematographic montage, and intending to suggest the fault lines between cinema and the inevitably ruptured articulation of language. Taking as a starting point that the text is a machine that activates a flux of thought between two subjects, Operation Rewrite makes wide use of black screen and of "spaces in negative" as machines of affection, expropriation, and displacement of meaning.

Operation Rewrite takes its name from a chapter of William S. Burroughs' novel Nova Express, where the author describes his subversive "cut-up" method, the aim of which is to explode the disaffecting "parasite organism" commonly known as language.

Experimental Conversations

Experimental Conversations is Cork Film Centre's online journal of experimental film, art cinema and video art. Experimental Conversations' website is operated strictly not-for-profit with all operating costs paid for by Cork Film Centre.  Maximilian Le Cain is the editor of the online magazine Experimental Conversations.

Experimental Film Society
Experimental Film Society is an independent, not-for-profit film production company specialising in experimental, independent and no/low budget filmmaking. It was founded in 2000 in Tehran, Iran. Its aim is to produce and promote films by its members. Experimental Film Society unites works by a dozen filmmakers scattered across the globe, whose films are distinguished by an uncompromising, no-budget devotion to personal, experimental cinema. Experimental Film Society is responsible for rescuing and preserving many of its members' films, which otherwise might have been lost forever. Maximilian Le Cain is an honorary member.

Filmography

All films were directed and written by Maximilian Le Cain

2013 Areas of Sympaphy
2012 Habits of a Lifetime (Notes Towards a Dream Diary by Humphrey Esterhase)
2012 Strange Attractor
2012 Money Spent at Night (Super-8 only, sound on tape)
2012 Ordinary Video 3
2012 Dirt (made with Vicky Langan)
2012 Persistencies of Sadness & Still Days (Take 2) (Two part feature film made with Rouzbeh Rashidi)
2012 Wölflinge 12/4/'12 (made with Vicky Langan)
2012 The End of the Universe as Red (Super-8 only, sound on tape)
2012 "Scene 4" of the Experimental Film Society portmanteau feature The Last of Deductive Frames
2011 Ordinary Video 2
2011 Ordinary Video 1
2011 JR: Dream This in Remembrance of Me (video for internet)
2011 Lullaby (made with Vicky Langan)
2011 The Last Films of Humphrey Esterhase
2011 Dark, Plastic, Reversal (Super-8 only, sound on tape)
2011 In Advance
2011 Desk 13 (made with Vicky Langan)
2011 Hereunder (made with Vicky Langan)
2011 Background
2011 Wölflinge 17/11/'10
2011 Operation Rewrite (ongoing internet project in collaboration with Esperanza Collado)
2011 Now (video for internet)
2011 The Most Beautiful Video on the Internet (video for internet)
2010 Approach (video for internet)
2010 Somewhere It Is Snowing (video for internet)
2010 Presence 1–20 (video series for internet)
2010 Hotel La Mirage
2010 Involuntary Participation (sound by Karen Power)
2010 Ten Minutes Isn't Worth a Dream (made with Humphrey Esterhase)
2010 Monochrome Dreams (music video for Makeshift Minehsaft)
2010 Slow Tape
2010 Coming Soon (as Soltan Karl)
2010 Bouquet
2010 Smudge
2010 Light / Sound (made with Vicky Langan)
2010 Sentiment
2010 Surface
2010 Home Movie
2010 Monologue
2010 Dirty Sheets of Time (as Soltan Karl)
2010 Feed (as Soltan Karl)
2010 Hushed Light (as Soltan Karl)
2010 No Way (as Soltan Karl)
2010 The Last Man on Earth Dreams of Cat Shit (as Soltan Karl)
2010 Everybody's Favourite Disease (as Soltan Karl)
2010 Night Vision 1–4 (as Soltan Karl)
2010 Evening Ascent
2010 Next
2010 The Soldeck Cycle (as Soltan Karl)
2009 ... And The Poor Bird Died
2009 The Hamilton Cell
2009 Carve
2009 Private Report
2009 This Video is Still Here
2009 on Pause
2009 10 Pieces of Video for Internet]
2009 Dead or Alive
2009 The Everywhere Trilogy
2009 Closing
2009 The Mongolian Barbecue
2009 Letter from Echo
2008 Point of Departure
1997– 2008 Now Then
2008 John Puts a Chair Away
2008 Afternoons With Johnny
2008 Small Example
2008 Valley of the Kings
2008 Since
2008 Available Light
2007 Making a Home
2007 (...from a dying hotel)
2006 FP: Lessons in Disquietude
2006 Rendezvous
2006 Game of Truth
2006 (Pr)Evens (made with Tim Furey)
2005 Forgotten Films
2005 This film is not a lifesaving device
2005 One Long Breath

See also
Rouzbeh Rashidi

References

Further reading
 Maximilian Le Cain: Beyond the Cretinous World of Images by Esperanza Collado

External links
 Official blog
 
 

1978 births
Living people
Irish film directors
Irish film critics
Irish experimental filmmakers
People from Cork (city)
Place of birth missing (living people)